Lars Karlsson may refer to:

 Lars Karlsson (handballer) (born 1948), Swedish handball player
 Lars Erik Karlsson, Swedish darts player
 Lars Karlsson (chess player) (born 1955), Swedish Grandmaster
 Lars Karlsson (ice hockey) (born 1960), Swedish ice hockey player
 Lars Peter Karlsson (born 1966), Swedish ice hockey player